Ali al-Uraydi ibn Ja'far al-Sadiq, better known simply as Ali al-Uraydi, was the son of Ja'far al-Sadiq and the brother of Isma'il, Musa al-Kazim, Abdullah al-Aftah, and Muhammad Al-Dibaj. He was known by the title al-Uraydi, because he lived in an area called  Urayd, about 4 miles (or 6.4 km) from Medina. He was also known by the nickname Abu al-Hasan (i.e. father of Hasan).

Life

Ali al-Uraydi was born and raised in Medina. He was the youngest son of Ja'far al-Sadiq. After his father died whilst he was still a child, he left Medina for the town of Al-Urayd, where he settled and became the sheikh of all Banu Hashim and the Naqib (prefect) of the descendants of Muhammad.

He lived approximately 100 years, until the time of his brother Musa al-Kazim’s great-grandson Ali al-Hadi (828-868) and died in Al-Urayd and was buried there.

Descendants
The children and descendants of Ali al-Uraydi became known as al-Uraydiyun. They inhabited many areas, including Al-Urayd, Kufa, Baghdad, Sham (Greater Syria), Nusaybin, Turkey, Ahwaz, Rayy (Tehran), Isfahan, Yazd, Qom, Khwarazm and Afghanistan. 
His sons were:
Ahmad al-Sha'rani
Hasan
Ja'far al-Asghar
Muhammad al-Naqib - who was born in Medina. After his father died, he left for Basra, where he became the Naqib (prefect) of the Ahl al-Bayt. He was a man of great learning who preferred isolation and was known for his zuhd (abstinence).
Isa al-Rumi - He was a great 'alim (learned scholar) and ‘arif (spiritual master). He was the Naqib of the Ahl al-Bayt in Basra.
Ahmad al-Muhajir (873-956/260-345H) - who was born in Basra. Al-Tabari, the famous 'alim and historian, held him in great esteem and gave him immense respect. He held the company of Bishr al-Hafi, among others. After performing Hajj in 318 A.H. he migrated to Hadhramaut in the same year and settled there. From Hadhramaut he called people to God. He was given the title Al-Muhajjir (the Emigrant) primarily because he had travelled the path to God and secondarily because he had emigrated from Iraq to Hadhramaut. From Hadhramaut his descendants became the illustrious Alawi sadat, and most Sayyid’s and Habib’s residing in Indonesia and Southeast Asia are descended from him.
Ubayd Allah
Alawi - who became a great Imam. It is from his name from whom the name of the tribe Bani Alawi is derived. Therefore, the Bani Alawi is the Ashraaf sadat (noble descendants) of Muhammad. Furthermore, many  families in Hadhramaut, India, the Hejaz, Africa, Indonesia, Malaysia, Singapore, Myanmar and the rest of the world are descendants of Imam Alawi ibn Ubayd Allah.
Muhammad
Ali
Husayn
Muhammad. His descendants currently reside in Isfahan, Iran. 
Yahya. His descendants currently reside in Hillah, Iraq. 
Ali (Abu Ja'far): His descendants reside in Homs, Syria.

Other descendants
Muhammad al-Faqih al-Muqaddam (1178–1255) - Founder of Ba 'Alawiyya sufi order.

Abu Bakr al-Aydarus (1447–1508) - the Mansab (religious leader) of Aden, Yemen.

Abd Allah ibn Alawi al-Haddad (1634–1720) - Islamic scholar from Tarim, Yemen.

Nine Saints
Nine Saints (Wali Songo) are not from Al-Aydarus family
Sunan Maulana Malik Ibrahim (d.1419 C.E.) - one of the Wali Sanga ("Nine Saints") involved in propagating Islam in Indonesia.
Sunan Ampel - one of the Wali Sanga ("Nine Saints") involved in propagating Islam in Indonesia.
Sunan Bonang - one of the Wali Sanga ("Nine Saints") involved in propagating Islam in Indonesia.
Sunan Drajat - one of the Wali Sanga ("Nine Saints") involved in propagating Islam in Indonesia.
Syarifah
Sunan Kudus - one of the Wali Sanga ("Nine Saints") involved in propagating Islam in Indonesia.
Another daughter
Trenggana - who succeeded his father as leader of the Demak Sultanate.
Sunan Giri - one of the Wali Sanga ("Nine Saints") involved in propagating Islam in Indonesia.
Sunan Murya - one of the Wali Sanga ("Nine Saints") involved in propagating Islam in Indonesia.

Ahmed Abdallah Mohamed Sambi - the President of Comoros since 26 May 2006.

Umar bin Hafiz - Islamic scholar from Tarim, Yemen. Founder of Dar al-Mustafa Madrasa.

Ali al-Jifri - Islamic scholar from UAE. Founder of Tabah Foundation.

Religious knowledge
Ali al-Uraydi was a man of great knowledge. He was a transmitter of Hadith, and was quoted in a large number of books written by the famous 'ulama of his and subsequent ages.

See also
Alids

Notes

Hashemite people
9th-century people from the Abbasid Caliphate
Family of Muhammad
8th-century people from the Abbasid Caliphate